Uttar Banga Krishi Vishwavidyalaya (English: North Bengal Agricultural University) is a public state agricultural university in Pundibari about 11 km North-West of Cooch Behar, West Bengal, India. It offers degree courses in Agricultural Engineering, Agriculture and Horticulture. It was established in 2001 by an Act of the West Bengal legislature.

Organisation and Administration

Governance
Chancellor of the university is the governor of West Bengal. The Vice-chancellor of the Uttar Banga Krishi Vishwavidyalaya is the chief executive officer of the university. Swarup Chakraborty is the current Vice-chancellor of the university.

Faculties and Departments
Departments of the Uttar Banga Krishi Viswavidyalaya are organized into three faculties.

 Faculty of Agriculture: This faculty consists of the departments of Agronomy, Agricultural Extension, Agricultural Statistics, Agricultural Economics, Agricultural Entomology, Biochemistry, Plant Pathology, Genetics & Plant Breeding, Soil Science & Agricultural Chemistry, and Seed Science & Technology.
 Faculty of Horticulture: This faculty consists of the departments of Pomology & Post Harvest Technology, Plantation Crops & Processing, Floriculture Medicinal & Aromatic Crops, Vegetable & Spice Crops, and Forestry.
 Faculty of Agricultural Technology: This faculty consists of the departments of Agricultural Engineering.

Directorate of Extension Education
There are five Krishi Vigyan Kendras (KVK) under this university:

 Cooch Behar Krishi Vigyan Kendra at the Pundibari, Cooch Behar
 Darjeeling Krishi Vigyan Kendra at the Kalimpong, Darjeeling
 Dakshin Dinajpur Krishi Vigyan Kendra at the Majhian, Dakshin Dinajpur
 Uttar Dinajpur Krishi Vigyan Kendra at the Chopra, Uttar Dinajpur
 Malda Krishi Vigyan Kendra at the Ratua, Malda

Farm Facilities
Uttar Banga Krishi Viswavidyalaya has a well-developed Agricultural Experimental Farm of about 300 acres at Pundibari, Cooch Behar, West Bengal.

Academics

Courses
Uttar Banga Krishi Viswavidyalaya offers the following courses:
 Undergraduate: B.Sc in Agriculture, B.Sc in Horticulture, and B.Tech in Agricultural Engineering.
 Postgraduate: M.Sc in Agriculture, M.Sc in Horticulture, and M.Sc in Forestry
 Doctor of Philosophy: Ph.D. in Agriculture, Ph.D. in Horticulture, and Ph.D. in Forestry

Admission
Students are admitted each year in the undergraduate courses of the university (B.Sc in Agriculture and Horticulture) on the basis of their performance in the higher secondary (10+2) examination. One has to take the WBJEE examination for admission in the B.Tech Agricultural Engineering course. For admission in postgraduate and doctoral level courses, one has to take an entrance examination either conducted by the university or by a national agency like ICAR, UGC, etc.

Central Library
There is a central library at the main campus of the university at Pundibari. It has collections of more than 25000 books. There are also small unit libraries at different research stations of the university.

Ranking and Accreditation
Uttar Banga Krishi Viswavidyalaya holds 55th rank in the ICAR agricultural university ranking list 2019, India.

References

Agricultural universities and colleges in West Bengal
Universities and colleges in Cooch Behar district
Educational institutions established in 2001
2001 establishments in West Bengal